The Last Star is the third album to be released by American hard rock band Halfcocked, the band's major label début. The album was released in 2001 by the DreamWorks imprint Megatronic. It features new versions of songs from the first two albums, and some new material. It was recorded at Larrabee East studio in North Hollywood and produced by Ulrich Wild, known for his work with bands like Buckcherry and Deftones. "Always" appears in the 2001 video game Portal Runner as the title and main menu background music.

Track listing
"I Lied" – 4:10 (Johnny Heatley, Sarah Reitkopp)
"Always" – 3:23 (Heatley, Reitkopp)
"Drive Away" – 3:10 (Heatley, Reitkopp)
"All By Myself" – 2:44 (Jhen Kobran, Reitkopp)
"Held Under" – 2:06 (Kobran, Reitkopp)
"Over" – 3:06 (Charlee Johnson, Reitkopp)
"Gun for Hire" – 3:02 (Heatley, Reitkopp)
"Sell Out" – 3:53 (Heatley, Reitkopp)
"Thanks for the Ride" – 2:34 (Johnson, Reitkopp)
"Sober" – 4:06 (Heatley, Reitkopp)
"Touch Down" – 2:39 (Kobran, Reitkopp)
"Devil Shoes" – 2:23 (Johnson, Reitkopp)
"Glitter" – 3:44 (Heatley, Reitkopp)

Personnel

Sarah Reitkopp : Singer
Tommy O'Neil : Guitar
Johnny Rock Heatley : Guitar
Jhen Kobran : Bass, backing vocals
Charlee Johnson : Drums
Jaime Richter : Guitar, backing vocals

References

Halfcocked albums
2001 debut albums
Albums produced by Ulrich Wild
DreamWorks Records albums